is a superhero anime television series produced by Toei Animation and The Walt Disney Company Japan, based on the Marvel Comics universe. The series began airing in Japan from April 2, 2014, on TX Network stations.  The series was aimed at boys 6–12 and tied in with merchandising produced by Bandai.

Premise
With help from Japan's Dr. Nozomu Akatsuki, Iron Man develops a new device called the Digital Identity Securement Kit, known as DISKs for short, designed to help the cause of stopping and detaining villains. However, whilst presenting the DISK project on the Raft, the villainous Loki appears and uses the very same DISKs to launch a breakout of all the captured villains, trapping Captain America, Iron Man, Hulk, Thor and Wasp inside DISKs as well. Nozomu's sons, Akira and Hikaru, along with three other children, Edward, Chris, and Jessica, come to possess these DISKs and obtain biocodes, allowing them to bring out these superheroes for a short period of time. Teaming up with the Avengers, the group travel across the world to search for DISKs before they fall into the wrong hands.

Characters

The Heroes 
These five children have what is known as a Bio-Code graphed into them, due to their proximity to the Bio-Code Installer when it was destroyed by Loki. Because of this and the security programs installed in the DISKs, the kids are the only ones who can release the heroes in question via a process referred to as "D-Smash". However, because the encoding was corrupted, each hero can only be released for five and a half minutes before being forcibly sent back.

The DISKs are divided into five categories based on the imprisoned hero or villain's abilities: red Tech DISKs, blue Fight DISKs, purple Energy DISKs, green Power DISKs, and yellow Animal DISKs.

Children 
  
 
 A cheerful, carefree young boy and the main protagonist. The younger son of DISK developer Nozomu Akatsuki, he is hot-blooded and has a strong sense of justice. He and his older brother Hikaru are invited to visit their father's research lab on the Raft for the unveiling of the DISK project when it comes under attack by Loki's forces. Akira possesses the Tech Bio-Code, allowing him to summon red DISK heroes like Iron Man, Falcon, and War Machine.

  
 
 Akira's older brother, and the more calm and mature of the two. He is a prodigy with a quiet and composed personality. He possesses the Energy Bio-Code, allowing him to summon purple DISK heroes like Thor, Nova, Cyclops, and Doctor Strange.

 
 
 The oldest of the five children. He comes across as a cynical bad boy, but is gentle-hearted and likes to make sweets. He possesses the Fight Bio-Code, allowing him to summon blue DISK heroes like Captain America and Iron Fist. His name appears to be a nod to Chris Evans who plays Captain America in the Marvel Cinematic Universe.

 
 
 The youngest of the five children. He is a sweet, shy, kind and lively boy and good student. A big fan of superheroes, he joined the tour on the Raft in hopes of meeting Captain America, who is his favorite hero. He possesses the Power Bio-Code, allowing him to summon green DISK heroes like Hulk and Power Man. His name appears to be a nod to Edward Norton, who played the Hulk in the 2008 film The Incredible Hulk.

 
 
 A rich girl from France whose parents run a business. She is described as "naive and selfish" and is forthright in speaking her mind, though not with malicious intent. Because of her varied interests, Jessica has many skills she uses to trick the villains. She possesses the Animal Bio-Code, allowing her to summon yellow DISK heroes like Wasp, Black Panther, and Beast.

Avengers 
 
 
 A Genius, billionaire, playboy, and philanthropist. He fights using a mechanical suit of armor with flight and various integrated weapons. Stark worked with Dr. Akatsuki on the development of the DISK project, which he was presenting at the Raft when Loki attacked. After being trapped in a DISK, he becomes Akira's partner.

 Steve Rogers / Captain America
 
 A World War II veteran and super-soldier. He fights with his unbreakable vibranium shield and hand-to-hand combat skills. He always puts duty and the mission above everything else and has a tendency to take things too seriously. After being trapped in a DISK, he becomes Chris's partner.

 Thor Odinson / Thor 
 
 The Norse God of Thunder and the future king of Asgard. He wields Mjolnir, an indestructible hammer that can control thunderstorms and lightning. After being trapped in a DISK, he becomes Hikaru's partner.

 Bruce Banner / Hulk
 
 A gamma-irradiated scientist turned monster. He has incomparable physical strength and a body that can withstand intense punishment. After being trapped in a DISK, he becomes Ed's partner.

 Janet Van Dyne / Wasp
 
 The only female member of the Avengers. She is a fashion designer as well as a superhero and uses her small size and superior agility to outwit opponents. After being trapped in a DISK, She becomes Jessica's partner.

Other Allies 

 Virginia "Pepper" Potts
 
 Tony Stark's assistant. She visits Japan to formally invite the Akatsuki brothers to the Raft to visit their father. Following Loki's attack, she escapes with the children to one of Stark's safehouses. From there, she becomes head of Stark Industries in Stark's absence and acts as a support team member for the heroes during their missions.

 Peter Parker / Spider-Man
 
 A wisecracking superhero who gained superpowers after being bitten by a radioactive spider. Parker is a Stark Industries scientist and the assistant of Dr. Akatsuki, developing the DISK technology with him. He is one of the only heroes to escape being sealed in a DISK, and provides the Avengers' DISKs to the heroes to fight back against Loki and his forces. He protects New York in the Avengers' absence while occasionally assisting the team when needed.

Villains 

 Loki Laufeyson / Loki (ロキ)
 
 The main antagonist, and the adopted brother and archenemy of Thor. He uses the DISKs to free all the prisoners on the Raft, allowing them to escape, while trapping the heroes inside DISKs of their own. In the aftermath of his attack, he disguises himself as Senator Robert Winters and takes over S.H.I.E.L.D. in an attempt to find the DISKs scattered around the globe. He later loses a fight against the Avengers and the X-Men and is trapped in another world with Dr. Akatsuki. Loki eventually escapes and returns to New York, ultimately being captured in a DISK by Akira in the final episode.

Celebrity Five 
A team of five masked human villains working with Loki to retrieve all the missing DISKs and place the world's superheroes and supervillains under their control. The group is led by former S.H.I.E.L.D. agent Tim Gilliam and consists of reporter Rosetta Riley, chef Manino Giordani, musician Joel Murphy, and swordsman Okuma Jubei. Following Loki's defeat, the Celebrity Five are arrested, but are freed and forcibly recruited into Hydra by the Red Skull.
 Tim Gilliam
 

 Rosetta Riley
 Voiced by:Sachiko Kojima (Japanese); Kari Wahlgren (English) 

 Manino Giordani
 Voiced by:Tarusuke Shingaki (Japanese); Kyle Hebert (English)

 Joel Murphy
 

 Okuma Jubei

Hydra 
 Johann Schmidt / Red Skull
 
 The head of the Hydra terrorist group, and the archenemy of Captain America. After the defeat of Loki, Red Skull becomes the second main antagonist of the series, maintaining more control over the DISKs than Loki through the use of the Dimension Sphere.

Media 

Marvel Disk Wars: The Avengers, produced by Toei Animation, began airing on TV Tokyo from April 2, 2014. The series is helmed by series director Toshiaki Komura, a veteran director for Toei Animation's Precure franchise. Series organization is provided by King Ryū, who has no previous credits in the entertainment industry. Veteran Dragon Ball animator and character designer Tadayoshi Yamamuro provides character designs, much in the same style as Dragon Ball. An English dub began airing on July 6, 2015 on Disney XD in Southeast Asia, Disney Channel in the Philippines, and both Disney Channel and its programming block Disney XD in Taiwan. It premiered in India in English, Hindi, Tamil & Telugu audios on Marvel HQ on March 16, 2020.

Video game 
A video game based on the series, titled  was developed by Bandai Namco Games and was released in Japan for the Nintendo 3DS on November 13, 2014.

Bachicombat 
Bachicombat is Bandai's collectible game tied in with the TV show. The game is similar to the game Pogs. It is meant to simulate the plot of the show which sees young kids who possess a unique "Biocode" summon heroes and villains trapped inside S.H.I.E.L.D. tech that Loki's turned against the Marvel Universe.

See also 
 Marvel Anime
 Marvel Future Avengers

References

External links 
 Official website at TV Tokyo 
 
 

2014 anime television series debuts
Japanese children's animated action television series
Japanese children's animated adventure television series
Japanese children's animated science fiction television series
Japanese children's animated superhero television series
Animated television series about children
Animated television series based on Marvel Comics
Avengers (comics) television series
Superheroes in anime and manga
Toei Animation television
TV Tokyo original programming
Television shows based on Marvel Comics
Disney XD original programming
Disney Channels Worldwide original programming
Anime based on comics
Television series by Disney